Murga is a form of popular musical theatre.

It may also refer to:

Places
Australia
Murga, New South Wales

Iran
 Murga, Khuzestan
 Murga, Kohgiluyeh and Boyer-Ahmad

Other
 Murga, Bulgaria
 Murga, Hungary
 Murga, Álava, village in Ayala/Aiara municipality, Spain
 Murga (peak), mountain in Kosovo

People
 Carli de Murga
 Francisco de Murga
 Romeo Murga

Other
Murga punishment, stress position used as a punishment in parts of South Asia
La Murga, 1963 Argentine film
Instituto de Higiene del Doctor Murga (Seville)

See also
Murgas (disambiguation)